Alastair Mark Cavenagh (born 1964) is a Kenyan-based rally driver and entrepreneur born in Wales in Great Britain. He drives in the Safari Rally occasionally, including a second-place finish in 2009, when it was an IRC event. Cavenagh therefore got his first podium in the series.

He raced in the WRC in eight rallies from 1998 to 2001, but only finished one which was Acropolis in 2001.

References

External links
 eWRC results

British rally drivers
Kenyan rally drivers
1964 births
World Rally Championship drivers
Intercontinental Rally Challenge drivers
Living people